Carmela Carvajal Briones (July 16, 1851 - August 16, 1931) was the wife of Arturo Prat Chacón.

1851 births
1931 deaths
People from Quillota